Third World Genocide is the sixth and final studio album by Nuclear Assault, released in 2005. It is their first studio album since Something Wicked (1993) and the first to feature original bassist Dan Lilker since Out of Order (1991). Third World Genocide was the last studio album the band had released before their breakup in 2022, though they recorded four new songs for their 2015 EP Pounder.

Track listing

Personnel
 Erik Burke - guitar
 Dan Lilker - bass, vocals
 Glenn Evans - drums, producer
 John Connelly - choir, chorus, guitar, vocals
 Matthew Azevedo - mastering
 Rudy DeDoncker - photography
 Tim Koukos - 5-string banjo, engineer, guitar (acoustic), guitar (rhythm), jaw harp, mixing, producer, vocals (background)
 Chris Kozdra (Red Right Hand) - vocals (background on Long Hair Asshole)
 Pete DeMaggio - lead guitar on "Defiled Innocence"
 Kevin Mead - artwork

References

2005 albums
Nuclear Assault albums
SPV/Steamhammer albums